The 2014 BWF Super Series, officially known as the 2014 Metlife BWF Super Series for sponsorship reasons, was the eighth season of the BWF Super Series. For this season, an annual US$400,000 of player incentive scheme bonus payment shared among the year-end top 10 players/pairs once they fulfil various media and sponsorship commitments.

Schedule
Below is the schedule released by the Badminton World Federation:

Results

Winners

Performance by countries
Tabulated below are the Super Series performances based on countries. Only countries who have won a title are listed:

Finals

Korea

Malaysia

England

India

Singapore

Japan

Indonesia

Australia

Denmark

France

China

Hong Kong

Masters Finals

References

 
BWF Super Series
Super Series Premier and Super Series